Wan-chun (or Wanjun) is a 1990 Taiwanese television series produced by Ping Hsin-tao and his company Yi Ren Communications Co. in conjunction with Chinese Television System, based on Chiung Yao's (Ping's wife) 1964 novellette Wan-chun's Three Loves, which is set in Republican era Beijing.

This is the first Taiwanese TV series filmed in mainland China, and as such suffered from red tape by Taiwan's Government Information Office. Despite receiving prior approval, the production was accused of "cooperating with Chinese communists", "receiving mainland funds", and "featuring mainland actors in excess" (even though most actors were from Taiwan). Chiung Yao refused to comply with censorship demands to delete scenes that "featured mainland actors in excess", and only after the interventions of politician Jaw Shaw-kong was the series allowed to air. (Chiung Yao and Ping Hsin-tao's company was however fined for several violations.)

Cast
Yu Hsiao-fan as Hsia Wan-chun
Jin Ming as Hsia Wan-chun (child)
Chang Pei-hua as Chou Po-chien
Cai Yuanhang as Chou Po-chien (child)
Hsu Nai-lin as Chou Chung-kang
Dong Yang as Chou Chung-kang (child)
Sze Yu as Chou Shu-hao
Li Yeyi as Chou Shu-hao (child)
Chin Su-mei as Yen-hung
Cui Shangqi as Yen-hung (child)
Wang Yu-ling as Tsui Shang-chi
Liang Hsiu-chi as Tsui Shang-lun
Fan Hung-hsuan as Chou Tsung-ting
Lee Lee-feng as Chang Yu-chin
Tseng Che-chen as Lan Hsuan
Kwan Yi as Grandma
Lee Yu-lin as Wang Wen-chu
Tu Su-chen as Lee Ming-fang
Liu Yueh-ti as Wang Hsiao-fang
Chen Shufang as Mother Yu
Song Zuying as Anu
Yue Yueli as Tsui Ping-cheng

References

1990 Taiwanese television series debuts
1990 Taiwanese television series endings
Chinese Television System original programming
Mandarin-language television shows
Television shows based on works by Chiung Yao
Television shows set in Beijing
Television shows filmed in Hunan
Television series set in the 1910s
Television series set in the 1920s